renegadepress.com is a Canadian teen drama television series, produced by Vérité Films for the Aboriginal Peoples Television Network.

Plot
The storyline follows the lives of a group of teenagers running an e-zine about their daily experiences. The main characters are Zoey (Ksenia Solo), an average upper middle-class girl who thinks of herself as a bit of a nerd, and Jack (Bronson Pelletier), a boy of First Nations origin. The series deals with teenage topics, including relationships, sex and drugs. Every season, two to three new characters are introduced, who join in writing the e-zine. These characters are usually added to explore new areas of teen life and problems.

The show is no longer in production, although reruns continue to air on APTN. In 2008, the Global Television Network also began airing the show's first season. TFO, the French language educational broadcaster in Ontario, has also aired a French dubbed version of the program. In 2012, renegadepress.com made its American debut on the Starz channel Starz Kids & Family.

Cast
 Bronson Pelletier as Jack Sinclair
 Ksenia Solo as Zoey Jones
 Ishan Davé as Sandi Bhutella
 Shawn Erker as Oscar Cherniak
 Rachel Colwell as Crystal Sinclair
 Ingrid Nilson as Patti
 Magda Apanowicz as Alex Young
 Nolan Gerard Funk as Ben Lalonde
 Ephraim Ellis as Dylan
 Katlin Long-Wright as Heath Stevenson
 Matthew Strongeagle as Michael
 Wendy Anderson as Linda Jones, Zoey's mother
 David Neale as  Brian Jones, Zoey's father 
 Lorne Cardinal as Wayne Sinclair, Jack and Crystal's father 
 Curtis Lum as Connor 
 Nikki Elek as Suzie

References

External links
renegadepress.com 

2000s Canadian teen drama television series
2004 Canadian television series debuts
2008 Canadian television series endings
Aboriginal Peoples Television Network original programming
CTV 2 original programming
Global Television Network original programming
Citytv original programming
TFO original programming
TVO original programming
Starz original programming
English-language television shows
Television series by Bell Media
Television series by Corus Entertainment
Canadian television soap operas
Television series about teenagers
Television shows set in Saskatchewan
First Nations television series